Rodney Eugene Monroe (born April 16, 1968) is a retired American professional basketball player who played in the National Basketball Association (NBA) and other leagues. He was selected by the Atlanta Hawks in the second round (30th pick overall) of the 1991 NBA draft. 

A 6'3" (1.90 m) shooting guard, Monroe played only one year in the NBA with the Hawks during the 1991–92 season, appearing in 38 games and scoring a total of 131 points. Monroe also played professionally in Australia, Greece, Israel, Italy (for Carne Montana Forli (1998–1999)), Fabriano Basket a.k.a. Banca Marche Fabriano (1999–2002) and Euro Roseto (2002–2003), Spain, and the Philippines. Currently, Monroe is the director of basketball operations and men's basketball coach at SouthLake Christian Academy in Huntersville, North Carolina.

Monroe played collegiately at North Carolina State and was the Atlantic Coast Conference Player of the Year in 1991 after averaging 27.0 points per game. He broke David Thompson's school scoring record at NC State and is fourth on the ACC's all-time scoring list with 2,551 career points. In 2002, Monroe was named to the ACC 50th Anniversary men's basketball team as one of the fifty greatest players in Atlantic Coast Conference history.

Monroe attended St. Maria Goretti High School in Hagerstown, Maryland and played in the competitive Baltimore Catholic League.

References

External links
With Chris Corchiani at N.C. State, as Fire and Ice (1988-91)

1968 births
Living people
All-American college men's basketball players
American expatriate basketball people in Australia
American expatriate basketball people in Cyprus
American expatriate basketball people in Greece
American expatriate basketball people in Israel
American expatriate basketball people in Italy
American expatriate basketball people in the Philippines
American expatriate basketball people in Spain
American men's basketball coaches
American men's basketball players
Atlanta Hawks draft picks
Atlanta Hawks players
Basketball players from Baltimore
Basket Rimini Crabs players
Canberra Cannons players
Fabriano Basket players
Florida Beachdogs players
Juvecaserta Basket players
Keravnos B.C. players
McDonald's High School All-Americans
NC State Wolfpack men's basketball players
Parade High School All-Americans (boys' basketball)
Rochester Renegade players
Roseto Sharks players
Shooting guards
Sportspeople from Hagerstown, Maryland
United States men's national basketball team players
Alaska Aces (PBA) players
Philippine Basketball Association imports
Shell Turbo Chargers players
Magnolia Hotshots players